Harold Trowbridge Pulsifer (November 18, 1886 in Manchester, Connecticut – 1948 in Sarasota, Florida) was an American poet and magazine editor.

Life
He graduated from Harvard University in 1911.  He lived in Mountainville, New York. He edited The Outlook (New York) magazine, from 1913 to 1928, and was a friend of Theodore Roosevelt.

His collection of Winslow Homer paintings, are held at Colby College Maine.

His work appeared in The New Yorker.

He retired to Harpswell, Maine.

Awards
 Golden Rose Award
 1938 Finalist for Pulitzer Prize

Works

Poetry

Fiction

Anthologies

References

1886 births
1948 deaths
Harvard University alumni
20th-century American poets
People from Manchester, Connecticut
American magazine editors
20th-century American non-fiction writers